Father O'Nine is a 1938 British comedy film directed by Roy Kellino and starring Hal Gordon,  Dorothy Dewhurst and Claire Arnold. It was made at Wembley Studios as a quota quickie by the British subsidiary of Twentieth Century Fox. The film's sets were designed by the art director Carmen Dillon.

Cast
 Hal Gordon as Eddie Mills  
 Dorothy Dewhurst as Mill Wilson  
 Claire Arnold as Miss Pip  
 Jimmy Godden as Colonel Briggs  
 Denis Cowles as Blenkinsop  
 Joe Monkhouse as Albert

References

Bibliography
 Low, Rachael. Filmmaking in 1930s Britain. George Allen & Unwin, 1985.
 Wood, Linda. British Films, 1927-1939. British Film Institute, 1986.

External links

1938 films
British comedy films
1938 comedy films
1930s English-language films
Films shot at Wembley Studios
Films directed by Roy Kellino
Films set in England
Quota quickies
British black-and-white films
1930s British films